is an international football referee from Japan. He has refereed many matches in the AFC Champions League and FIFA World Cup qualifiers at the international level. He is also a referee in J. League Division 1 in Japan.

Controversy

2022 AFF Championship: Vietnam vs Malaysia 
The Group B match between Malaysia and Vietnam was marred by controversy, when Sato who officiated the match are deemed to gave a sudden controversial decision to award a penalty to Vietnam following a clash between Malaysian Azam Azmi and Vietnamese Đoàn Văn Hậu outside the penalty box which saw Azam being sent off, although a similar foul made by Văn Hậu towards Azam was ignored by the same referee. A complaint was made by the Football Association of Malaysia (FAM) towards the ASEAN Football Federation (AFF) regarding the "perceived biasedness of Sato's officiating conduct" since a similar incident had also occurred before in another Malaysia-Vietnam encounter during 2022 FIFA World Cup qualification held in the United Arab Emirates. Through the letter, FAM request for Sato to never refereeing any matches involving Malaysia in the future. Nevertheless, earlier before the controversial decision was made, Sato announced that 2022 would be the last year of his refereeing career when he announced his retirement by the end of the year. On 3 January 2023, AFF responded to the FAM's letter by giving Azam a two-match ban, where he would miss Malaysia's last group stage match against Singapore and the semi-final first leg against Thailand. Azam also needed to pay a fine of US$1,000 that must be settled in 30 days. The decisions were not appealable.

AFC Asian Cup

References

1977 births
Japanese football referees
Living people
People from Nagoya
2018 FIFA World Cup referees
Football referees at the 2016 Summer Olympics
AFC Asian Cup referees